The Chambers Island lighthouse is a lighthouse located on Chambers Island in Door County, Wisconsin. The new light is identified by the USCG as 7-21895.

It was added to the National Register of Historic Places in 1975 as reference #75000063.

Notes

Further reading

 Havighurst, Walter (1943) The Long Ships Passing: The Story of the Great Lakes, Macmillan Publishers.
 Oleszewski, Wes, Great Lakes Lighthouses, American and Canadian: A Comprehensive Directory/Guide to Great Lakes Lighthouses, (Gwinn, Michigan: Avery Color Studios, Inc., 1998) .
 
 Sapulski, Wayne S., (2001) Lighthouses of Lake Michigan: Past and Present (Paperback) (Fowlerville: Wilderness Adventure Books) ; .
 Wright, Larry and Wright, Patricia, Great Lakes Lighthouses Encyclopedia Hardback (Erin: Boston Mills Press, 2006) .

External links

Door County Lighthouses, Door County Marine Museum
Chambers Island Light entry in Seeing the Light (Archived May 9, 2021)
Lighthouse friends article
NPS Inventory of Historic Light Stations - Wisconsin (Archived March 14, 2012)

History of the Chambers Island Lighthouse - lists replacement skeletal light

Lighthouses completed in 1868
Houses completed in 1868
Lighthouses in Door County, Wisconsin
Lighthouses on the National Register of Historic Places in Wisconsin
National Register of Historic Places in Door County, Wisconsin